Scott Houston may refer to:

 Scott Houston (musician), piano player, author, teacher and television personality
 Scott Houston (athlete) (born 1990), American pole vaulter